Notovoluta gardneri is a species of sea snail, a marine gastropod mollusk in the family Volutidae, the volutes.

Description
The species attains a size of 75-85 mm.

Distribution
Queensland, East coast of Australia.

References

Volutidae
Gastropods described in 1983